Fiorenza Cossotto (born 22 April 1935) is an Italian operatic mezzo-soprano.

Life and career
Born on 22 April 1935, in Crescentino, Province of Vercelli, Italy, Cossotto attended the Turin Academy of Music and studied with Mercedes Llopart. She made her operatic debut as Sister Matilde in the world premiere of Poulenc's Dialogues of the Carmelites in 1957 at La Scala in Milan. Her international debut was at the 1958 Wexford Festival as Giovanna Seymour in Donizetti's Anna Bolena. Her Covent Garden debut was in 1959 as Neris in Cherubini's Médée, with Maria Callas in the title role. A 1962 performance of the lead in La favorita at La Scala led to wider fame and she made her American debut in the same role in 1964 at the Lyric Opera of Chicago and as Amneris at the Metropolitan Opera in 1968.

Between the seasons of 1967–68 and 1988–89, Cossotto gave 148 performances at the Met (exclusively leading roles). She was considered an expert in portrayals of major mezzo/contralto roles in mid-19th-century Italian opera such as Favorita (La favorita), Amneris (Aida), Azucena (Il trovatore), Eboli (Don Carlos), Preziosilla (La forza del destino), Maddalena (Maddalena), Ulrica (Un ballo in maschera) and Laura (La Gioconda). She also portrayed Carmen, Mozart's Cherubino, Urbain in Meyerbeer's Les Huguenots, Bellini's Romeo and Marfa in Khovantschina.

In 2005, Cossotto celebrated her 70th birthday with a performance of Suor Angelica at the Théâtre Royal in Liège, Belgium.

Cossotto was married to the Italian bass Ivo Vinco for over 40 years (ending in divorce). They had a son.

According to the book Opera, "She [Cossotto] and Giulietta Simionato were the leading Italian mezzo-sopranos of the 1960s and 1970s. She [Cossotto] won plaudits in the annals of operatic history for her wonderful vocal timbre, her perfect singing technique, and the ease with which she could master different registers. Besides singing the great mezzo roles, she also took the outstanding alto parts of the Italian operatic repertoire."

Apart from mezzo and alto roles, Cossotto also sang soprano roles traditionally sung by mezzos such as Santuzza (Cavalleria Rusticana) and Adalgisa (Norma).

She sang Adalgisa next to the Normas of Callas, Joan Sutherland, Montserrat Caballé, Leyla Gencer, and Elinor Ross

Her repertory at the Met included Amneris, Eboli, Adalgisa, Santuzza, Azucena, Dalila, Carmen (only on tour and in outdoor park concerts), Principessa di Bouillon (Adriana Lecouvreur) and Mistress Quickly (which she added in 1985, singing with Giuseppe Taddei as Falstaff).

Studio discography

References

https://www.allmusic.com/artist/fiorenza-cossotto-mn0000767314/biography

External links
 Interview with Fiorenza Cossotto and Ivo Vinco by Bruce Duffie, September 29, 1983

1935 births
Living people
Italian operatic mezzo-sopranos
20th-century Italian women opera singers
People from Crescentino